Natalie Press (born 15 August 1980) is an English actress. She is known for her performance in the 2004 film My Summer of Love and a number of short and feature-length independent films, including Wasp (2003), which won the Academy Award for Best Live Action Short Film. In 2008, her performance in Fifty Dead Men Walking earned her a nomination for the Independent Spirit Award for Best Supporting Female. In 2010, she was nominated for the BAFTA TV Award for Best Actress for her work in the three-hour BBC miniseries Five Daughters.

Early life
Press is from North London. After studying Fine Art at university, she worked as an office temp and as a video store clerk on Fulham Road until the success of My Summer of Love.

Career
Press' first credited screen role was in a 2001 episode of the BBC television series Holby City. Her film debut and first lead role was in the short film Wasp (2003), which went on to win the Academy Award for best short film in 2005. She was recognised by the London Film Critics Circle and the Evening Standard British Film Awards for her work in My Summer of Love (2004) and nominated for a European Film Award in the category of Best European actress the same year. She made her professional stage debut in The Weather, a new play Clare Pollard, performed as part of the Royal Court Theatre's 2004 Young Playwrights Season. In 2005, Press appeared as Caddy Turveydrop (née Jellyby) in the acclaimed BBC serialisation of Dickens' Bleak House. Also in 2005 she appeared in the BBC television drama Mr. Harvey Lights a Candle.

In 2006, Press starred in Josh Appignanesi's feature film Song of Songs, which won a commendation in the Michael Powell Award for best British film 2005 at the Edinburgh festival. Later that year she also starred in the same director's short film Ex Memoria - produced by Oscar-winning producer Mia Bays - a film about a woman with Alzheimer's disease. Press starred as the young version of the character Eva. The short was nominated in the category of Best UK short at the British Independent Film Awards.

In 2006 Press appeared in Red Road (also by Andrea Arnold, the director of Wasp) (the first film in the proposed Advance Party trilogy) which won the Jury Prize at the 2006 Cannes Film Festival and in the two-part drama series Damage which was broadcast on Irish television. In the same year she won the Glamour magazine award for best newcomer in association with Nokia.

Press appeared in the short film Son (2008) by BAFTA winner Daniel Mulloy, which went on to win a slew of international awards including Best British Short Film at the Edinburgh International Film Festival in the UK. She also starred in Inseparable opposite Benedict Cumberbatch, and in In Transit, a World War II drama set in Russia which also features John Malkovich. Forthcoming films include Knife Edge and The Sea Change.

On 8 March 2007, Press performed in an Art Plus drama fundraising event at the Whitechapel Art Gallery opposite Rhys Ifans, Martine McCutcheon and Samantha Morton. In 2007 she was, alongside Cecilia Dean and Helena Christensen, one of the new faces of the Japanese clothing label Uniqlo and featured in the music video for Turin Brakes' single "Stalker". She made her radio debut in October 2007 in the BBC Radio play Wes Bell by Matthew Broughton.

In 2010 she was nominated for Independent Spirit Award for Best Supporting Female for her film Fifty Dead Men Walking.

Press worked on period love story Where I Belong (2012) in the leading role of Rosemarie, starring opposite Johannes Krisch.

Filmography

Film

Television

References

External links 

 

1980 births
English film actresses
English Jews
English radio actresses
English stage actresses
English television actresses
English voice actresses
Living people
Actresses from London
21st-century English actresses
Jewish English actresses